Centennial Beach is a public aquatic park located at 500 W. Jackson Avenue in Naperville, Illinois. The Beach is within an abandoned, double quarry alongside the DuPage River. The facility covers almost 6 acres (24,000 m²) of land with a full two acres (8,000 m²) or 6.2 million gallons of open water from Lake Michigan, all tested, re-circulated and chlorinated on site. 

Among its features is a sand beach next to the shallow end of the pool which offers a zero-depth entry. At the zero depth area of the pool, there are 2 large water play features which pour water from about  up, and water spouts that shoot up water for children to play in and cool off. In the  area there are 3 lanes for lap swimmers, where Centennial Beach’s swim team, The Mudrats, practice each weekday morning before open swim hours. 

The shallow end also has a slide that was added in 2008. The shallow end also has an area called the “channel.” This area is right next to the deep end and the diving boards. In the channel there is a pool lift for people who cannot use the ladders to get into the pool, they can be let in on the lift. The deep end of the beach has 2 floating rafts in the middle for swimmers to swim out to. The deep end also has 4 piers on the sides of the deep end for swimmers to sit and relax on without sitting on the walkway. 

The deep end has an NCAA and USS-approved diving complex, which houses two one-meter springboards and one three-meter board. 

Centennial beach is open on all non-school days from Memorial Day to Labor Day. Centennial Beach’s open swim hours are 11:00am – 8:00pm Monday through Saturday and 11:00am – 6:00pm on Sunday. The Beach opens early on Saturdays and Sundays for “Adult Float” which is a time where adults can come in with any sort of floating devices (not allowed during regular open swim time) and swim with them. Adult float is every Saturday and Sunday from 9:00–10:55am. Every Saturday morning at 7:00am the Centennial Beach lifeguards train and do drills for 2 hours before the pool opens. In the event of inclement weather, poor conditions, low attendance, or insufficient staffing the manager may close the beach or certain sections of the beach. In mid-August the beach begins to close earlier than usual due to early darkness. 

Centennial Beach receives about 2,500 visitors on an average warm summer day. Over the course of a year the beach receives about 155,000. The beach plays host to various athletic events and is known for its nationally competitive lifeguard team.

Skatepark
Centennial Beach has an adjacent skatepark to the west. The skatepark opens at 9:00am, and closes at dusk. This facility includes skating elements, such as half-pipes, quarter pipes, fun boxes, rails and more. This skate park is unsupervised, and free of charge for non-motorized skateboards, in-line skates, and scooters. The use of a bicycle can only be used during bike hours at some sport complexes. Any other wheeled or sliding devices will be prohibited from the park. Skate at your own risk.

Ball Field
Centennial Beach also has a baseball field that is used by the Naperville Little League. Naperville Little League wouldn't be a program if boys and girls ages 7 years of age through 12 years of age weren't on teams. The league a child will play in corresponds with the distract the school they attend too. This complex was made possible by donations and other community groups and was completed in 2005. Recently, added in new bleachers, fencing around the fields, and a new entryway. There will be many parking spots for parents to park in even if they aren't going to Centennial Beach. Near two ball fields there is a park, with a kid area, and a place where older kids can go and wander around.

Deep-Water Test 
Centennial Beach has a strict swimming requirement for the deep end which is blocked off by a pool safety rope. Swimmers who are not passed the 8th grade must be able to past the deep water test every year once in order to be able to swim in the deep water. Those who pass the deep water test receive a wristband, in this case they wear it to ensure they are able to use the diving boards and swim in the fifteen foot deep end. A participant must swim 100 yards uninterrupted to be eligible.

Adult Float 
Every weekend there will be an adult float for participants to relax on inner tubes or swim around. The beach allows adults eighteen years and older on Saturday and Sunday from 9am – 10:55am to swim during adult swim. However, nobody under the age of eighteen may enter the beach until 11am. This allows for adults to freely swim in the deep end with no distractions; such as, screaming children, loud noises, in this case it will allow adults to relax.

Lifeguards 

Safety is a major priority at Centennial Beach. Centennial Beach’s licensed guards are trained in CPR, First Aid, and Ellis Lifeguarding. Many Beach guards also have a SCUBA certification. The lifeguards at Centennial Beach have received annual and national recognition for outstanding aquatics safety. The lifeguards are continually ranked among best of all Ellis insured facilities. New applicants to be lifeguards at Centennial Beach begin training in the chilly water in May. Training is extremely vigorous and time consuming. Veteran guards at the Beach are also required to attend pre-season training for the season which begins at the beginning of May. During pre-season training the head-guards and veteran guards teach the new guards CPR, lifeguarding skills, and first-aid. Training six days a week for the whole month of May and continues into June depending on individual applicant's readiness. If by the end of pre-season training the head-guards do not feel that a new applicant guard is ready they will not be given a job as a guard. Training to become a lifeguard at Centennial Beach is very difficult and usually more than 70% of lifeguard applicants do not make it through training.

The Grill 
The Grill was added to Centennial Beach in 2011. From afar employees in the kitchen can be spotted with neon shirts. It houses a full kitchen, including grills and fryers. Their menu ranges from the classic beach food, burgers and chicken fingers, to healthy choices, including grilled chicken and wraps. Everyone can either pay with card or cash. If a membership card is used, a discount will be applied to the order. There are two main cash registers, but on a really hot day towards the right of the building they open up a third which is hidden and not many people notice it. In this case, having a third register open helps out the line when it becomes super long on busy days.

Centennial Grill Hours:

— Monday-Saturday: 11am – 7pm

— Sunday: 11am – 6pm

They also have a secret menu, which only dedicated patrons will know (ask for the beach soda). One may have to be careful on busy days because the lines may become 50 to 60 people long. Every order is well prepared so it will be fresh to the sight.

Bathhouse 

The bathhouse was constructed in 1934 using stones from the old Main Street bridge. The bathhouse includes a front office where patrons can pay for memberships or one-time visits to the beach, a manager’s office, showers, lockers, washrooms, changing rooms, and a lower guard house. The old side office of the bathhouse, which was removed after 2011 renovations, used to be used as a concession stand. Anyone who lives in Naperville will receive a discount off their ticket, as for others who aren't in the area they will have to pay full price. Once anyone enters on either side of the entryway, there will be four family restrooms. The men's restroom as you enter will be on the far left, women's restroom will be slightly to the right. Once in the men or woman's restroom, you will notice two drinking fountains, stalls to change into, storage for belongings, washrooms, and showers. The bathhouse had an old side office within which was later removed after 2011 renovations, it was used as a concession stand. Below the bathhouse, down the stairs there will be the guard house, where lifeguards on/off duty will stay and relax before they go out on the beach to watch over families.

Mudrats 

Centennial Beach has a swim team for children up to age 18. The mascot for the Beach’s swim team is the Mudrats. The swim team helps to enhance competitive strokes, conditioning, starts, turns, and more. The Mudrats have swim practice each weekday morning in the Centennial Beach lap lanes unless there is bad weather. The Mudrats have practice at Naperville Central High School on Fridays so that they can practice starts and turns since the beach is too shallow to dive into and has dark water so it is more difficult to do turns. Attendance for each swimmer is taken within 5 minutes of each practice. There are a total of 5 practices a week, every swimmer must attend 3 out of 5 in order to qualify to swim at all of the meets. Swim caps and goggles are mandatory for each practice. Swim meets cannot be placed without the dedication of parents. There are up to seventeen opportunities for parents to volunteer and help out the Mudrats swim team. All workers who decide on working a meet must arrive 45 minutes before the start time. A Mudrat could win or lose and the coaches and parents will always strive for them to do their best no matter what.

History 

Centennial Beach was purchased by the Permanent Memorial Committee in 1931. The actual development of the pool began in 1932 as a memorial for Naperville’s 100th Anniversary.
During the early years of the beach Naperville residents swam for free and non-residents had to pay 10 cents for children and 35 cents for adults to swim at the pool for the day. On Sundays and holidays the price went up to 50 cents per person. In the beach’s first year it made $6,000.

According to a booklet produced by the Naperville Park District in 2006 to commemorate the 75th anniversary of the Beach, in the 1930s, income from the Beach was used to finance city projects.

The limestone bathhouses were completed in 1935. To commemorate the building of the bathhouse in 1935 the Beach held its first water show. More water shows took place at the Beach in the 1940s and 1950s, which served as a culmination of Red Cross summer swimming, water ballet, and diving classes.

Centennial Beach held its first Aquathon event in 1955. This Aquathon included community members doing water skiing demonstrations, high-dive exhibitions and synchronized swimming. Proceeds for this aquathon were donated to the then-new Edward Hospital.

In 1956 a similar event (to the aquathon) took place at the Beach. The fire department supplied an exciting fountain from the middle raft. The proceeds for this event went to the new fire station.

In 1969 the District assumed responsibility for Centennial Beach.

In 1970 the “Save the Beach Committee” was formed, composed 34 community members, to keep the pool from shutting down.

In 1976 the diving area was re-done, along with a new circulation and chlorination system the next year.

In 1981, when the Beach celebrated its 50th anniversary the Aquathon was resurrected with similar activities and shows to celebrate the Beach’s earlier years.
The aquathon was done again at Centennial Beach on July 8, 2006 for the Beach’s 75th anniversary. The 2006 aquathon included activities like sandcastle and sand burying contests, greased watermelon and innertube races, bozo buckets and tug-of war, kayak demonstrations, scavenger hunts, pier tag tournaments, live music entertainment, cartoonist, face painters, balloon artists, a skate challenge, a water polo tournament, and a variety of unique and entertaining water-based performances for all ages. The aquathon of 2006 was all day, from 11am – 8pm.

During a significant flood on July 18, 1996, 17 inches of rain caused water levels to rise to the top of the high dive (three meters), contaminating the chlorinated water with river water and storm water.

From 2002–2004 more than 2 million dollars of renovations were put into the beach. Renovations included new concrete decks around the facility, a new circulation system, new lighting and sound systems, new staircases leading to the bathhouses and water play features.

On April 22, 2006 Centennial Beach held its first “Bottom-Feeder Ball.” The bottom-feeder ball was a birthday party for the Beach’s 75th anniversary. The bottom-feeder ball was a dinner held at the bottom of the empty quarry. The funds from this event were used to purchase the beach’s slide for the shallow end. The bottom-feeder ball began at 3:30 and had a variety of different types of entertainment that did not end until dark. The bottom-feeder ball had numerous posters for guests to look at, T-shirts to embellish, and the Waubonsie Valley High School Jazz Combo and the Naperville North High School Symphonic Orchestra performed. Guests received a 3-course dinner at the ball and the opportunity to see the bottom of the Beach while it was empty.

References

Geography of Naperville, Illinois
Tourist attractions in DuPage County, Illinois
Buildings and structures in DuPage County, Illinois
Quarries
Quarries in the United States
Public Works Administration in Illinois
Works Progress Administration in Illinois